Major Archiepiscopal Marth Mariam Archdeacon Church, Kuravilangad is a Marian pilgrim center of the Syro-Malabar Church located at Kuravilangad in Kottayam district. This church claims to date to 105 AD.
The church has an ancient bell with the engraving on Syriac language "Mother of God." Three majestic bells were brought from Germany in 1911 and is one of the largest bells in Asia.

The church is also known for its Kappalottam or "racing ship," a commemoration of the biblical story of Jonah and the whale.

History

Gallery

References

Bibliography
 

Shrines to the Virgin Mary
Churches in Kottayam district
Syro-Malabar Catholic church buildings